The 5th National Council of Bangladesh Nationalist Party was the event for the topmost policy-making bodies and panels of leaders of Bangladesh Nationalist Party to get elected. According to the party constitution that was amended lastly on August 16, 2009, the panel of policy-making bodies and other administrative bodies will be active until a next council takes place and elects a new set of leaders to replace the existing one.

The council was held on December 8, 2009 at Bangabandhu International Convention Centre (formerly China-Bangladesh Friendship Centre) at Sher-e-Bangla Nagar, Dhaka.

Events 

The National Executive Committee of the party includes with 251 members of 45 different positions including the Chairperson and Vice-Presidents of the party. The council attempted to elect at least one-third of the required members to form the executive policy-making body.

A delegation of 40 members comprising with mostly the senior regional leaders, leaders of the branch organizations and dignified activists from each of 300 constituencies were invited to be part of the council.

A set of 2,512 leaders among the total of 12,000 was set to chair as the councilors. The election process was driven by the evaluations and polls from these councilors.

Invitees also included people from at least 60 other countries, including observers and analysts, local and foreign journalists and representatives from multiple political and other organizations.

At least 33% of the executive body were women.

Tareq Rahman 

The Senior Joint Secretary General of the organization Tareq Rahman who has been recently elected a Senior Vice Chairman, addressed to the audience as the video recorded from his Edmonton, London residence was played in the event. Many among the audience were reportedly found failing to hold tears while Tareq was describing his days of being persecuted, imprisoned and tortured. Tareq Rahman notified about his physical condition and confirmed the protraction of his pause from political activities.

George Galloway 

British politician George Galloway addressed to the audience clarifying that Bangladesh requires a friendly relationship with India for her own interest, but no room should be offered to a compromise in the Tipaimukh dam issue. He told the Tipaimukh Dam issue should be made a discussion of the United Nations Climate Change Conference 2009 at Copenhagen. Galloway also confirmed that Britain will break her silence if any injustice is imposed on Bangladesh on the Tipaimukh dam flap.

Delegation from Bangladesh Awami League 

The ruling party Awami League that occupies a position of the largest opponent of BNP, sent a delegation of four to the council headed by Ashim Kumar Ukil MP, organization's Secretary of Media Affairs. Ashim Kumal Ukil MP greeted Begum Khaleda Zia on behalf of the Prime Minister and Awami League President Sheikh Hasina. He addressed to the audience for a while where he told, as a major party BNP needs to grow stronger than ever to strengthen the democracy of Bangladesh, and Bangladesh Awami League as well as the government completely supports its council to be a success.

Election Commission extols the Council 

The Election Commission Secretariat has officially extolled the successful National Council of BNP. In fact it was the Election Commission that amended certain rules those made the registered political parties sincere about executing successful councils to continue their operation under the watchdog's approval.

Reactions 

A National Council of the party after 16 years was matter of widespread anticipations and later the reactions.

Many considered the initiative being largely successful . Observers including representative of the rival Awami League have praised the organized way of observing the event. Some reviews suggest that the magnitude of the council and participation from its instruments, international observers, political representatives and the media however didn't reflect the distress the party has been facing for last three years both in organization and unity of the leaders.

However the council could not evade criticism from critics and also from the general mass. An online poll by The Daily Star reveals 64.4% of its online readers do not think that BNP's 5th national council reflected any qualitative changes in the party. After a meeting of the Central Working Committee of Awami League, its leaders made remarks that the council has been a part of the wrong politics of Bangladesh Nationalist Party. The council also received much criticism as it empowered re-elected party chair-person Khaleda Zia to pick other members for the National Executive Committee and Standing Committee, ignoring the party charter that stipulates election to the posts. Moreover, the BNP National Council elected Khaleda Zia's son Tareq Rahman as a powerful Senior Vice-Chairman in a move apparently designed to smooth his path to the party helm.

According to the new party charter passed by the national council of BNP, war criminals convicted under Bangladesh Collaborators (Special Tribunals) Order, 1972 can now have membership or leadership of BNP's committees at any level and even get BNP nominations for contesting in parliamentary elections as the party has deleted the barring provision from its constitution. War Crimes Fact Finding Committee, an organization advocating the movement against war-crimes committed amid the 1971 liberation struggle reveals, "By deleting the provision from its constitution, BNP is encouraging war criminals unethically to do politics".

See also
 Politics of Bangladesh
 List of political parties in Bangladesh
 Elections in Bangladesh

References

External links
 Official Page on Event

Bangladesh Nationalist Party
2009 in Bangladesh